The Georgia Bulldogs college football team represents the University of Georgia in the East Division of the Southeastern Conference (SEC). The Bulldogs compete as part of the National Collegiate Athletic Association (NCAA) Division I Football Bowl Subdivision. The school has had 26 head coaches since it began play during the 1892 season. Kirby Smart is the current head coach of the bulldogs.

The team has played more than 1,200 games over 118 seasons of Georgia football. Six coaches have led the Bulldogs to postseason bowl games: Wally Butts, Vince Dooley, Ray Goff, Jim Donnan, Mark Richt, and  Kirby Smart. Five coaches also won conference championships: Herman Stegeman won one as a member of the Southern Intercollegiate Athletic Association; Butts, Dooley, Richt, and Smart won a combined thirteen as a member of the SEC. During their tenures, Butts, Dooley and Smart each won a national championship with the Bulldogs.

Dooley is the leader in seasons coached and games won, with 201 victories during his 25 years with the Bulldogs. Four of the team's coaches—Pop Warner, Butts, Dooley and Donnan—have been inducted into the College Football Hall of Fame.

Key

Coaches

Notes

References 
General

 
 

Specific

Lists of college football head coaches
Georgia (U.S. state) sports-related lists